The 1964 NCAA College Division basketball tournament involved 32 schools playing in a single-elimination tournament to determine the national champion of men's NCAA College Division college basketball as a culmination of the 1963–64 NCAA College Division men's basketball season. It was won by the University of Evansville, with Evansville's Jerry Sloan named the Most Outstanding Player.

Regional participants

Regionals

East - Hempstead, New York
Location: Memorial Hall Host: Hofstra University

Third Place - Philadelphia Textile 94, Catholic 64

Mideast - Akron, Ohio
Location: Memorial Hall Host: Municipal University of Akron

Third Place - Youngstown State 91, Ithaca 79

Northeast - Worcester, Massachusetts
Location: Andrew Laska Gymnasium Host: Assumption College

Third Place - Assumption 64, Springfield 60

South Central - Owensboro, Kentucky
Location: Owensboro Sportscenter Host: Kentucky Wesleyan College

Third Place - Kentucky Wesleyan 91, Centre 71

Southwest - Beaumont, Texas
Location: Beaumont Civic Center Host: Lamar State College of Technology

Third Place - Lamar 116, Colorado State College 85

Midwest - Cedar Falls, Iowa
Location: West Gym Host: State College of Iowa

Third Place - Washington (MO) 77, Nebraska Wesleyan 74

Pacific Coast - Fresno, California
Location: North Gym Host: Fresno State College

Third Place - Seattle Pacific 76, Nevada 74

Great Lakes - Evansville, Indiana
Location: Roberts Municipal Stadium Host: Evansville College

Third Place - Jackson State 92, Ball State 71

*denotes each overtime played

National Finals - Evansville, Indiana
Location: Roberts Municipal Stadium Host: Evansville College

Third Place - North Carolina A&T 91, Northern Iowa 72

*denotes each overtime played

All-tournament team
 Buster Briley (Evansville)
 Larry Humes (Evansville)
 Maurice McHartley (North Carolina A&T)
 Jerry Sloan (Evansville)
 Bill Stevens (Akron)

See also
 1964 NCAA University Division basketball tournament
 1964 NAIA Basketball Tournament

References

Sources 
 2010 NCAA Men's Basketball Championship Tournament Records and Statistics: Division II men's basketball Championship
 1964 NCAA College Division Men's Basketball Tournament jonfmorse.com

NCAA Division II men's basketball tournament
Tournament
Basketball in Beaumont, Texas
NCAA College Division basketball tournament
NCAA College Division basketball tournament